The Whisperer in Darkness is a 2011 independent horror film directed and produced by Sean Branney, Andrew Leman, and David Robertson and distributed by the H.P. Lovecraft Historical Society. Based on the H. P. Lovecraft short story of the same name, it was shot using Mythoscope, a blend of vintage and modern filming techniques intended to produce the look of a 1930s-era film. According to the film's website, the filmmakers intended to capture the look of "classic horror films of the 1930s like Dracula, Frankenstein and King Kong".

Plot
For the first two acts, the plot largely follows the short story. The third act consists of entirely new material in which the Mi-Go are revealed to worship Shub-Niggurath, and the protagonist, Wilmarth, uncovers an attempt by cultists to open a gateway between Yuggoth and Earth. He foils the plot with the help of Hannah, the child of one of the collaborators. His escape is unsuccessful and at the end of the film the audience discovers that Wilmarth has been narrating from a machine attached to the cylinder in which his brain now resides. This differs from the original story in which Wilmarth flees in the middle of the night and safely returns to Arkham.

According to Sean Branney on the making-of featurette "The Whisperer Behind the Scenes," Lovecraft was better at set-ups than endings. From a dramatic standpoint, Lovecraft's story brought the writers through what would be "Act Two" of a standard movie structure and felt incomplete. The character of Hannah and opening of gate to Yuggoth were introduced in order to "[make it] a good movie". Branney and Leman intended to make Wilmarth's world "more emotionally complicated" because Hannah's future caused him to be "invested in more than just himself". The characters of Wilmarth's three friends at Miskatonic University were developed from Call of Cthulhu role-playing characters created years before by Branney, Leman, and a friend. Regarding the introduction of a biplane, Leman commented, "If you have monsters that fly, you have to have a dogfight with a biplane."

Cast
In order of appearance:

 Paul Ita as Farmer
 Matt Foyer as Albert Wilmarth 
 Matt Lagan as Nathaniel Ward
 Lance J. Holt as Davis Bradbury
 Andrew Leman as Charles Fort
 Stephen Blackehart as Charlie Tower
 David Pavao as Jordan Lowell
 Don Martin as Dean Hayes
 Joe Sofranko as George Akeley
 Barry Lynch as Henry Akeley
 Martin Wately as Walter Brown
 Daniel Kaemon as P.F. Noyes
 Caspar Marsh as Will Masterson
 Autumn Wendel as Hannah Masterson
 Sean Branney as B-67
 Annie Abrams as Aviatrix
 Zack Gold as Astronomer
 John Jabaley as Superintendent

Production

The filmmakers used Mount Holyoke College to represent Miskatonic University. Pasadena City College is used for interior scenes of the school.

Sandy Petersen, author of the Call of Cthulhu role-playing game, contributed financially to the film in order to finish its production.

Release
The Whisperer in Darkness did not have a theatrical release but appeared at dozens of film festivals in over a dozen countries. It was then released on DVD and Blu-ray in early 2012.

Reception

The Whisperer in Darkness received highly positive reviews. It holds 86% approval rating on Rotten Tomatoes. On the Internet Movie Database it has 6.6 out of 10 stars. John J. Puccio of Movie Metropolis said "The atmospherics are in place, and the filmmakers catch the essence of Lovecraft's expansive horror with efficiency. The film is entertaining without attaining greatness." Andrew O'Hehir of Salon.com said "'Whisperer in Darkness' has a chiller-diller conclusion and some moments of real terror."

Awards

The Whisperer in Darkness was nominated at Oaxaca Film Fest.

 Gold Hugo—Nominated
 Free Spirit Award—Nominated

References

External links
 
 
  
  
 

2011 films
2010s supernatural horror films
American supernatural horror films
American black-and-white films
Cthulhu Mythos films
Direct-to-video horror films
2010s English-language films
Films set in 1931
Films set in Massachusetts
Films set in Vermont
Films shot in California
Films shot in Massachusetts
Films shot in New Hampshire
Films shot in Vermont
2010s American films